Bernardino Borlasca (c. 1580-c. 1631) was an Italian composer of the Renaissance and early Baroque eras, noted for antiphonal choral music.  He also wrote sacred and secular songs for a small number of singers, such as his canzonettas for three voices, published in 1611.

Published works

1609
 (Venice: Alessandro Raverii)

1611
 (Venice: Giacomo Vincenti)

1615
, Op. 5 (Venice: Giacomo Vincenti)

1616
, Op. 6 (Venice: Giacomo Vincenti)

1617
, Op. 7 (Munich: Anna Berg)

References

Renaissance composers
Italian Baroque composers
Italian male classical composers
1580 births
1631 deaths